Kopua vermiculata, the twilight clingfish, is a clingfish of the family Gobiesocidae, found only around Japan.

References

vermiculata
Taxa named by Gento Shinohara
Taxa named by Eri Katayama
Fish described in 2015